The discography of Shed Seven, an English indie rock band from York, consists of five studio albums, four live albums, four compilations, three videos, two extended plays and twenty singles.

Albums

Studio albums

Compilation albums

Live albums

Singles

Extended plays

Videos
Stuffed (1997) – VHS features all the Shed Seven promo videos up to the date of release, along with album tracks and B-sides recorded live in concert at the Forum, London on 15 November 1996.
See Youse at the Barras (2003) – DVD features Shed Seven recorded live in concert at Barrowland, Glasgow on 3 December 2002.
Classic Shed Seven (2005) – DVD released as part of the Universal Masters DVD Collection series, the disc contains the promo videos of 10 Shed Seven singles.
’’Gold - The Videos’’ (2007) - DVD, features 13 promo videos in chronological order from Dolphin to Disco Down.

References

Discographies of British artists
Rock music group discographies